The Men's Welterweight is a competition featured  at the 2009 World Taekwondo Championships, and was held at the Ballerup Super Arena in Copenhagen, Denmark on October 14. Welterweights were limited to a maximum of 80 kilograms in body mass.

Medalists

Results
Legend
DQ — Won by disqualification

Finals

Top Half

Section 1

Section 2

Bottom Half

Section 3

Section 4

References
 Official Report

Men's 80